Leadmine (also spelled out Lead Mine) is an unincorporated community in northern Dallas County, in the U.S. state of Missouri. The community is located about 3.5 miles east of Tunas on Missouri Route E. The Lead Mines Conservation Area lies one-half mile to the east. It is approximately 50 miles north-northeast of Springfield.

History
A post office called Lead Mine was established in 1877, and remained in operation until 1934. The community was named for a lead mine near the original town site.

Notable person
Roy Meeker, a Major League Baseball pitcher, was born at Leadmine in 1900.

References

Unincorporated communities in Dallas County, Missouri
Unincorporated communities in Missouri